The Jaguar XJR-7 is a IMSA GTP sports prototype race car, designed, developed, and built by Group 44, for Jaguar with the aim of competing, from 1985, in the IMSA GT Championship. Jaguar XJR-7s contested until 1988, before Jaguar replaced it with the Jaguar XJR-9.

Wins/Victories
1986 3 Hours of Daytona
1987 500 km of Riverside
1987 West Palm Beach 3 Hours

Drivers
Claude Ballot-Lena 
Whitney Ganz 
Hurley Haywood
John Morton
Brian Redman
Chip Robinson 
Vern Schuppan
Bob Tullius

References

External links

XJR-5
IMSA GTP cars
Rear mid-engine, rear-wheel-drive vehicles
24 Hours of Le Mans race cars
Sports prototypes